Resurrection (Italian: Resurrectio) is a 1931 Italian drama film directed by Alessandro Blasetti and starring Lia Franca, Daniele Crespi and Venera Alexandrescu. The film was the first Italian sound film to be made, but the studio held it back from release and another production by the company, The Song of Love, was the first film to be released. The film's production was troubled and it was not a commercial success.

Synopsis
A musical conductor plans to commit suicide after being abandoned by his lover. However, after saving a young boy from being run over and meeting a young woman who he falls in love with, he decides to live again.

Cast
 Lia Franca as La ragazza 
 Daniele Crespi as Pietro Gaddi 
 Venera Alexandrescu as La vamp 
 Olga Capri as La signora grassa sull'autobus 
 Mario Mazza as Un operaio sull'autobus 
 Giacomo Moschini as Un gentleman del tabarin 
 Alfredo Martinelli as Alto gentiluomo al tabarin 
 Aristide Baghetti as Un uomo al 'Astoria' 
 Giorgio Bianchi as Altro uomo al 'Astoria' 
 Giuseppe Pierozzi as Il barista 
 Idolo Tancredi as Un operaio alla fermata 
 Renato Malavasi as Spettatore al concerto 
 Umberto Sacripante as Altro spettatore

References

Bibliography 
 Verdone, Luca. I film di Alessandro Blasetti. Gremese Editore, 1989.

External links 
 

1931 films
Italian drama films
1931 drama films
1930s Italian-language films
Films directed by Alessandro Blasetti
Italian black-and-white films
1930s Italian films